Perudina is a settlement 2.5 km north of Vinica in the Municipality of Črnomelj in the White Carniola area of southeastern Slovenia. The entire area is part of the traditional region of Lower Carniola and is now included in the Southeast Slovenia Statistical Region.

References

External links
Perudina on Geopedia

Populated places in the Municipality of Črnomelj